The Macedonian First League (Makedonska prva liga) is the top-tier basketball competition in the Republic of North Macedonia organized by the Basketball Federation of North Macedonia. Macedonian Republic League was transformed in to top division level  Macedonian Basketball First League. After the transformation teams from the higher level federal Leagues (MZT and Rabotnički) joined the Macedonian First League.

Teams 

Strumica and Cair 2030  were promoted. Angeli and MZT Skopje 2 were relegated.

Champions

Performance by club

Players with three or more titles
<small>Note: This table is incomplete

References

External links
 Macedonian Basketball Federation 
 Macedonian Superleague at Eurobasket 
 Macedonian Premier League, Macedonian Basketball Federation website 

 
Basketball leagues in North Macedonia
Basketball leagues in Europe
Sports leagues established in 1992